Events from the year 1795 in the United States.

Incumbents

Federal Government 
 President: George Washington (no political party-Virginia)
 Vice President: John Adams (F-Massachusetts)
 Chief Justice: John Jay (New York), John Rutledge (South Carolina)
 Speaker of the House of Representatives: Frederick Muhlenberg (Anti-Admin.-Pennsylvania) (until March 4), Jonathan Dayton (Federalist-New Jersey) (starting December 7)
 Congress: 3rd (until March 4), 4th (starting March 4)

Events

 January 14 – The University of North Carolina (renamed The University of North Carolina at Chapel Hill in 1963) opens to students, becoming the first state university in the United States.
 January 29 – The Naturalization Act of 1795 replaces and repeals the Naturalization Act of 1790.
 February 7 – The 11th Amendment to the United States Constitution is passed.
 May 1 – Battle of Nu'uanu: Kamehameha I of the Island of Hawaii defeats the Oahuans, solidifying his control of the major islands of the archipelago and officially founding the Kingdom of Hawaii.
 June 8 – George Washington submits the Jay Treaty to the United States Senate for ratification.
 August 2 – The Treaty of Greenville is signed between the Western Confederacy and the United States, ending the Northwest Indian War.
 October 27 – The United States and Spain sign the Treaty of Madrid, which establishes the boundaries between Spanish colonies and the United States.

Ongoing
 Northwest Indian War (1785–1795)
 Slavery (1625–1865)

Births
 April 17 – George Edmund Badger, United States Senator from North Carolina from 1846 to 1855. (died 1866)
 June 2 – William S. Fulton, United States Senator from Arkansas from 1836 until 1844. (died 1844)
 August 31 – William Lee D. Ewing, United States Senator from Illinois in 1834. (died 1846)
 September 22 – Jesse Speight, United States Senator from Mississippi from 1845 until 1847. (died 1847)
 November 2 – James K. Polk, 11th President of the United States from 1845 until 1849. (died 1849)
 December 1 – James Whitcomb, United States Senator from Indiana from 1849 until 1852. (died 1852)

Deaths
 May 19 – Josiah Bartlett, signatory of the Declaration of Independence (born 1729)

See also
Timeline of United States history (1790–1819)

References

Further reading
 G. L. Rives. Spain and the United States in 1795. The American Historical Review, Vol. 4, No. 1 (October, 1898), pp. 62–79.
 Frederick J. Turner. Documents on the Blount Conspiracy, 1795–1797. The American Historical Review, Vol. 10, No. 3 (April, 1905), pp. 574–606.
 Edmund Randolph on the British Treaty, 1795. The American Historical Review, Vol. 12, No. 3 (April, 1907), pp. 587–599.
 Charles A. Kent. The Treaty of Greenville. August 3, 1795. Journal of the Illinois State Historical Society, Vol. 10, No. 4 (January, 1918), pp. 568–584.
 Arthur Preston Whitaker. Harry Innes and the Spanish Intrigue: 1794–1795. The Mississippi Valley Historical Review, Vol. 15, No. 2 (September, 1928), pp. 236–248.
 Marion Tinling. Cawsons, Virginia, in 1795–1796. The William and Mary Quarterly, Third Series, Vol. 3, No. 2 (April, 1946), pp. 281–291.
  James E. Cronin. Elihu Hubbard Smith and the New York Friendly Club, 1795–1798. PMLA, Vol. 64, No. 3 (June, 1949), pp. 471–479.
 Gerard Clarfield. Postscript to the Jay Treaty: Timothy Pickering and Anglo-American Relations, 1795–1797. The William and Mary Quarterly, Third Series, Vol. 23, No. 1 (January, 1966), pp. 106–120.
 John L. Earl III. Talleyrand in Philadelphia, 1794–1796. The Pennsylvania Magazine of History and Biography, Vol. 91, No. 3 (July, 1967), pp. 282–298.
 Thomas J. Farnham. The Virginia Amendments of 1795: An Episode in the Opposition to Jay's Treaty. The Virginia Magazine of History and Biography, Vol. 75, No. 1 (January, 1967), pp. 75–88.
 Chester McArthur Destler. "Forward Wheat" for New England: The Correspondence of John Taylor of Caroline with Jeremiah Wadsworth, in 1795. Agricultural History, Vol. 42, No. 3 (July, 1968), pp. 201–210.
 Edwin R. Baldridge Jr. Talleyrand's visit to Pennsylvania, 1794–1796. Pennsylvania History, Vol. 36, No. 2 (APRIL, 1969), pp. 145–160.
 Eugene P. Link. The Republican Harmony (1795) of Nathaniel Billings. Journal of Research in Music Education, Vol. 18, No. 4 (Winter, 1970), pp. 414–419.
 James R. Beasley. Emerging Republicanism and the Standing Order: The Appropriation Act Controversy in Connecticut, 1793 to 1795. The William and Mary Quarterly, Third Series, Vol. 29, No. 4 (October, 1972), pp. 587–610.
 George E. Brooks, Jr.  The Providence African Society's Sierra Leone Emigration Scheme, 1794–1795: Prologue to the African Colonization Movement. The International Journal of African Historical Studies, Vol. 7, No. 2 (1974), pp. 183–202.
 Jack Campisi. New York-Oneida Treaty of 1795: A Finding of Fact. American Indian Law Review, Vol. 4, No. 1 (1976), pp. 71–82.
 Richard Wojtowicz, Billy G. Smith. Advertisements For Runaway Slaves, Indentured Servants, and Apprentices in the Pennsylvania Gazette, 1795–1796. Pennsylvania History, Vol. 54, No. 1 (January 1987), pp. 34–71.
 Michael L. Kennedy. A French Jacobin Club in Charleston, South Carolina, 1792–1795. The South Carolina Historical Magazine, Vol. 91, No. 1 (January, 1990), pp. 4–22.
 Joanna Bowen Gillespie. 1795: Martha Laurens Ramsay's "Dark Night of the Soul". The William and Mary Quarterly, Third Series, Vol. 48, No. 1 (January, 1991), pp. 68–92.
 Leslie C. Patrick-Stamp. The Prison Sentence Docket for 1795: Inmates at the Nation's First State Penitentiary. Pennsylvania History, Vol. 60, No. 3 (July 1993), pp. 353–382.
 David P. Currie. The Constitution in Congress: The Third Congress, 1793–1795. The University of Chicago Law Review, Vol. 63, No. 1 (Winter, 1996), pp. 1–48.
 Glynn R. deV. Barratt. A Russian View of Philadelphia, 1795–96: From the Journal of Lieutenant Iurii Lisianskii. Pennsylvania History, Vol. 65, No. 1, Benjamin Franklin and His Enemies (Winter 1998), pp. 62–86.
 Albrecht Koschnik. The Democratic Societies of Philadelphia and the Limits of the American Public Sphere, c. 1793–1795. William and Mary Quarterly, Third Series, Vol. 58, No. 3 (July, 2001), pp. 615–636.

External links
 

 
1790s in the United States
United States
United States
Years of the 18th century in the United States